Zillur Rahman (1929–2013) was the president of Bangladesh.

Zillur Rahman may also refer to:
 Zillur Rahman (Kushtia politician), Bangladesh Nationalist Party politician and member of parliament for Kushtia
 Zillur Rahman (professor), Indian professor of management studies 
 Zillur Rahman Champak (born 1967), Bangladeshi chess player

See also
 Zillur Rahman Siddiqui (1928–2014), Bangladeshi writer, academic and educationist